Sensorization is a modern technology trend to insert many similar sensors in any device or application. Some scientists believe that sensorization is one of main requirements for third technological revolution.

As a result of significant prices drop in recent years there is a trend to include large number of sensors with the same or different function in one device. An example is the evolution of the iPhone.

See also 
Acsensorize

References

Sensorization
Technology forecasting
Measuring instruments